VIP Brother 10, also known as VIP Brother: Женско царство (lit. Women's Kingdom) was the tenth season of the Bulgarian reality television series VIP Brother. The show launched on 10 September 2018 on Nova TV and concluded 54 days later, on 2 November 2018. Atanas Kolev won, while Konstantin Trendafilov "Papi Hans" was the runner-up. Niki Kanchev, Aleksandra Sarchadjieva and Azis were the main presenters.

Housemates
17 housemates entered the house on Day 1.

Atanas 

Atanas Kolev is a rap singer, known for being a contestant on the second season of X Factor where he finished second. He entered the house on Day 1 and became the winner on Day 54.

Bozhana 
Bozhana Katsarova is a cook and the winner of third season of MasterChef. She entered the house on Day 1 and finished fifth in the finale on Day 54.

Denislava 
Denislava Sashova "Diona" is a rap singer. She entered the house on Day 1 and was the second evicted on Day 22.

Genoveva 
Genoveva Naydenova "Eva" is a famous pop singer from famous pop group Tonika. She entered the house on Day 1 and was the third evicted on Day 29.

Ivan 
Ivan Glavchev "Vanko 1" is a rap singer. He entered the house on Day 1 and decided to walk out of the house on Day 16.

Konstantin 
Konstantin Trendafilov "Papi Hans" is a writer and pop singer. He entered the house on Day 1 and finished second in the finale on Day 54.

Mira 

Mira Dobreva is a TV host. Her husband Georgi Tornev entered the VIP Brother 8 in 2016. She entered the house on Day 1 and was the fifth evicted on Day 50.

Nora 
Nora Nedkova is a model and the winner of the title "Miss Playmate 2017". She entered the house on Day 1 and was the first evicted on Day 8.

Lora 
Lora Karadzhova is a R&B singer and daughter of Yordan Karadzhov (the vocalist of the popular rock band Signal). She entered the house on Day 1 and was the sixth evicted on Day 52.

Petko 
Petko Dimitrov  is a businessman and husband of Yana. He entered the house on Day 1 and finished fourth in the finale on Day 54.

Richard 
Richard Velichkov is a fitness instructor and model. He entered the house on Day 1 and was the seventh evicted on Day 52.

Rosemary 
Rosemary Tisher is a model. Her father is German and her mother is Bulgarian. She entered the house on Day 1 and was the fourth evicted on Day 43.

Stefan 
Stefan Nikolov is a businessman and husband of popular TV host Gala (who entered the VIP Brother 3 in 2009). He entered the house on Day 1 and finished third in the finale on Day 54.

Valentin 
Valentin Kulagin is a makeup artist. He entered the house on Day 1 and was ejected on Day 36.

Vanya 
Vanya Kostova is a famous pop singer and former member of Tonika. She entered the house on Day 1 and was the eighth evicted on Day 53.

Veselin 
Veselin Plachkov is an actor. His fiancée Mariana Popova entered the VIP Brother 4 in 2012. He entered the house on Day 1 and decided to walk out of the house on Day 18.

Yana
Yana Akimova-Dimitrova is a dancer, choreograph in Dancing Stars, former girlfriend of Orlin Pavlov, who won VIP Brother 4 in 2012 and the wife of Petko. She entered the house on Day 1 and decided to walk out of the house on Day 10.

Nominations table

Notes

 : Denislava was nominated automatically by Big Brother after the multiple conspiracies. However, she was still eligible to nominate.
 : Nora had the right to nominate three housemates to the end of the show.
 : After she was evicted, Nora gave immunity to Vanya.
 : Ivan couldn't nominate or be nominated by the other housemates after losing rights as a regular housemate.
 : Rosemary's nomination to Stefan was voided because she didn't give a reason to nominate him and Big Brother cut 10% of the budget for the week because the housemates didn't stand in the sofas during the face-to-face nominations.
 : Richard was nominated after a vote on Facebook.
 : Eviction was cancelled after Ivan's will to leave the house voluntary.
 : Valentin received the most votes during the cancelled second eliminations. Thus, he got the right to give immunity to one of the housemates. Valentin gave immunity to Richard.
 : Originally, Bozhana, Valentin and Veselin were ejected from the house after a huge physical and verbal fight. However, Big Brother gave them a second chance to earn their rights as housemates. They were put in a secret juvenile center in order to improve their relations.  
 : After she was evicted, Denislava gave immunity to Richard.
 : After she was evicted, Genoveva gave immunity to Vanya.
 : Eviction was cancelled after clash between Vanya and Valentin. Viewers in Facebook had to determine who should be forcibly removed from the show.
 : After he was ejected, Valentin gave immunity to Richard.
 : Petko failed to nominate a second housemate and Big Brother restrict access to fitness of housemates.
 : After she was evicted, Rosemary gave immunity to Vanya.
 : The public were voting to win rather than to save.

References

External links
 Official website

2018 Bulgarian television seasons
VIP 10
2018 Bulgarian television series endings